Antagonise is the second album by Dutch metal supergroup MaYaN. It was released on January 31, 2014. The 11-song CD, recorded at the Sandlane studio with producer Joost van den Broek, features guest appearances by Floor Jansen, and future band member Marcela Bovio.

The cover artwork for "Antagonise" was created by Stefan Heilemann, who previously worked on MaYaN's debut album, Quarterpast.

Comments Mark Jansen: "It is based on the lyrics for 'Antagonise'." "Stefan doesn't need any directions; he reads the lyrics and comes up with a phenomenal piece of art. That's why we love working with this guy!" "When Snowden revealed the information about the mass electronic surveillance data mining program called Prism, what quite some people already thought became a proven fact. We all have been spied on for many years and all our data has been backed up and safely stored. It can be used any time it's needed. All of this in the name of 'war against terrorism,' which, in fact, basically is a cover-up and a way to bring fear to people to get them under control. This trick has already been used many times in the past. History just keeps repeating itself." "The media were covering the story, but politicians around the world, and in Europe in particular, didn't know how to react and remained silent. America is an ally, and not just a little one." "Since it became clear that the NSA (and let's not forget about their British partners in crime of the GCHQ) have also been spying on many world leaders, things have changed. Now it's finally all over the news!" "Is this the beginning of a turning point in history? Or will we allow a small group of elites to take all our freedom away for their own benefits?" "The constitution, the basis of our democracy, is not being respected." "Don't get yourself fooled, this is not in our interest." "If you want to see the truth, you'll see the truth." "We are what we eat!? A bunch of chickens, imprisoned and fully under control with no freedom whatsoever. This is what we will possibly become. If we let it all just happen..." "George Orwell, eat your heart out."

Track listing

Personnel
Band members
Mark Jansen – death growls, screams and orchestration
Henning Basse – vocals
Laura Macrì – vocals
Frank Schiphorst – guitars
Rob van der Loo – bass
Jack Driessen – keyboards, screams, orchestral arrangements
Ariën van Weesenbeek – drums, grunts

Guest/session musicians
Floor Jansen – lead vocals on tracks 3 & 4
Marcela Bovio – lead vocals on tracks 2, 7 & 9, choir
Dimitris Katsoulis – Virtuoso Violin

Links

References

2014 albums
Mayan (band) albums
Nuclear Blast albums